Allelochaeta is a genus of plant pathogens in the family Sporocadaceae.

It was published by Franz Petrak in Sydowia vol.9 (1–6) on page 464 in 1955.

Allelochaeta was considered as a synonym of Diploceras, one of the five groups of fungi into which the Seimatosporium complex was split by Nag Raj (in 1993). Based on a multi-gene phylogenetic study using the type species, Crous et al. (2018a), resurrected the genus Allelochaeta. Members of this genus are characterized by mostly 3-septate, hyaline or pigmented, concolourous or versicolourous conidia, having branched or solitary, cellular or continuous appendages (Crous et al. 2018a). Crous et al. (2018a) discussed the conidial septation, appendage types and pigmentation loss and gain during the evolution of Allelochaeta species.

History
Then in 1977, it was thought to be a synonym of Seimatosporium (another fungi in the Sporocadaceae family) in Mycol. Pap. 141 
Then in 1978, the fungal generic names of Allelochaeta, Basilocula, Ceuthosira, Pycnidiochaeta, and Xenodomus were found to be redundant. Allelochaeta and the single species of Allelochaeta gaubae was reduced to synonymy with Seimatosporium and Seimatosporium dilophosporum, respectively. Basilocula, Ceuthosira, and Xenodomus were then treated as synonyms of Coleophoma with species Coleophoma lauricola, Coleophoma aesculi, and Coleophoma taxi proposed as new combinations. The names Microgloeum and Microgloeum pruni were shown to be applicable to a microconidial state associated with Cylindrosporium padi. The generic name Neobarclaya is revived to accommodate Neobarclaya primaria and was segregated from Polynema in which Polynema ornatum and Polynema radiatum comb. nov. were then accepted. Pycnidiochaeta and its type species, Pycnidiochaeta biciliata, are reduced to synonymy with Dinemasporium and Dinemasporium gramineum, respectively.

In 2018, the appendaged coelomycete genus of  Seimatosporium (Sporocadaceae, Sordariomycetes) and some of its purported synonyms Allelochaeta, Diploceras and Vermisporium are re-evaluated. Based on DNA data for five loci (ITS, LSU, rpb2, tub2 and tef1), Seimatosporium was found to be paraphyletic. The ex-type species of Allelochaeta, Discostromopsis and Vermisporium represent a distinct sister clade to which the oldest name Allelochaeta was then used. These genera were traditionally separated based on a combination of conidial pigmentation, septation (having a septum or dividing wall), and the nature of their conidial appendages. Allelochaeta was found to include taxa with both branched or solitary appendages, that could be cellular or continuous, with conidia being (2-)3(-5)-septate, hyaline, or pigmented, con-colourous or versicolourous. These differences suggests that these characters should be applied at species, and not at the generic level. Conidial pigmentation appears to have been lost or gained several times during the evolution of species within Allelochaeta.

Hosts
Allelochaeta brevilata  is found on species of eucalypts in Australia.

Distribution
It is has a wide distribution, found in North America, Central America, Europe, South Africa, Australia, and New Zealand.

Species
As accepted by Species Fungorum;

Allelochaeta acuta 
Allelochaeta biseptata 
Allelochaeta brevicentra 
Allelochaeta brevilata 
Allelochaeta cylindrospora 
Allelochaeta dilophospora 
Allelochaeta elegans 
Allelochaeta euabalongensis 
Allelochaeta eucalypti 
Allelochaeta falcata 
Allelochaeta flexuosa 
Allelochaeta fusispora 
Allelochaeta gaubae 
Allelochaeta kriegeriana 
Allelochaeta melaleucae 
Allelochaeta minor 
Allelochaeta neoacuta 
Allelochaeta neocylindrospora 
Allelochaeta neodilophospora 
Allelochaeta neofalcata 
Allelochaeta neoorbicularis 
Allelochaeta neowalkeri 
Allelochaeta obliquae 
Allelochaeta obtusa 
Allelochaeta orbicularis 
Allelochaeta paracylindrospora 
Allelochaeta paraelegans 
Allelochaeta parafalcata 
Allelochaeta paraleptospermi 
Allelochaeta paramelaleucae 
Allelochaeta paraorbicularis 
Allelochaeta polycarpae 
Allelochaeta pseudoacuta 
Allelochaeta pseudoelegans 
Allelochaeta pseudofalcata 
Allelochaeta pseudoobtusa 
Allelochaeta pseudosamuelii 
Allelochaeta pseudowalkeri 
Allelochaeta samuelii 
Allelochaeta sparsifoliae 
Allelochaeta verrucispora 
Allelochaeta walkeri

References

Amphisphaeriales
Taxa named by Franz Petrak
Taxa described in 1955